The 2009 French Road Cycling Cup was the 18th edition of the French Road Cycling Cup. The 2009 calendar saw a reduction in events from 14 to 11, with the Tour du Haut Var, the Grand Prix de Rennes and Paris–Bourges losing their places on the calendar. The defending champion was Jérôme Pineau, who won the series for  but moved on to the Belgian team , and so did not feature much in the series. French rider Jimmy Casper of Besson Chaussures–Sojasun won the series, having led it throughout and winning three races.

Events

External links
  Coupe de France Standings

French Road Cycling Cup
French Road Cycling Cup
Road cyc